Elections were held in 1993 for both Senators and Deputies to the States of Jersey.

Senator Elections

Vernon Tomes 16,392 votes
Stuart Syvret 14,388 votes
John Rothwell 9,586 votes
Anne Bailhache 9,020 votes
Jean Le Maistre 8,934 votes
Dick Shenton 8,755 votes
Geraint Jennings 2,793 votes

Deputy Elections

St Helier Number One District

St Helier Number two district

St Helier Number three and four district

St Saviour Number one district

St Saviour Number two district

St Saviour Number three district

St Brelade Number one district

St Brelade Number two district

St Clement

Grouville

St John

St Lawrence

St Martin

St Mary

St Ouen

St Peter

Trinity

References

General 1993
1993 elections in Europe
General election